Gérald Dondon (born 4 October 1986 in Fort-de-France, Martinique) is a professional footballer who plays as a defender for Club Colonial and internationally for Martinique.

He made his debut for Martinique in 2008. He was in the Martinique Gold Cup squad for the 2017 tournament.

References

1986 births
Living people
Martiniquais footballers
French footballers
Martinique international footballers
Association football defenders
Sportspeople from Fort-de-France
2021 CONCACAF Gold Cup players